Augustine Pulu (born 4 January 1990) is a New Zealand rugby union footballer. His regular playing position is halfback. He plays for Hino Red Dolphins in Japan and Counties Manukau Steelers in the ITM Cup.

Career
Pulu began his senior career at the Karaka Rugby Football Club, where he debuted for the premier side in 2008. He was a member of the Chiefs wider training group for the 2012 season in which the Hamilton-based franchise claimed their first ever Super Rugby title, and was named in Dave Rennie's full squad for the 2013 season after playing an integral role in the Steelers' ITM Cup Championship triumph in 2012.

He helped the Chiefs win their second Super Rugby title in the final of the 2013 season against the Brumbies with a strong showing from the bench.

Pulu was called in to the All Blacks to cover for the injured Tawera Kerr-Barlow in 2014. Pulu made his debut for New Zealand in the 59th minute of a 74–6 win over the United States in Chicago, coming on for future Sevens and Blues team-mate Sonny Bill Williams. Pulu also replaced TJ Perenara with two minutes left in the 24–16 win over Scotland that year.

He made his New Zealand sevens debut in 2015. Pulu was selected for the New Zealand Rugby sevens at the 2016 Summer Olympics team but the team did not ultimately win a medal. Pulu was called into the All Blacks as a temporary replacement for troublesome veteran Aaron Smith during training for the third Bledisloe cup test of 2016, but did not play in that fixture.

Pulu signed with the Blues for the 2017 season and instantly became a regular starter for the team, delivering many solid performances across the season. Pulu's 2017 season included a start against the touring British & Irish Lions team in the Blues' historic 22–16 win against them on 7 June 2017. Pulu played for almost the entire match before being replaced by rookie Sam Nock with nine minutes left. Pulu also had a good Mitre 10 Cup campaign, but had his season ended prematurely after receiving a two-week suspension due to being red-carded against Manawatu for a dangerous tackle on Jade Te Rure. Counties Manukau went on to win the match 29-24 without Pulu.

Despite being red-carded for Counties Manukau at the end of the 2017 season, Pulu was named by Blues Head Coach Tana Umaga as captain for the 2018 season, replacing veteran hooker James Parsons.

References

External links
 
 
 
 Yahoo NZ profile
 itsrugby.co.uk profile
 

New Zealand sportspeople of Tongan descent
Living people
1990 births
New Zealand rugby union players
New Zealand international rugby union players
Chiefs (rugby union) players
Counties Manukau rugby union players
Rugby union scrum-halves
Rugby union players from Auckland
People educated at Wesley College, Auckland
Rugby sevens players at the 2016 Summer Olympics
Olympic rugby sevens players of New Zealand
New Zealand international rugby sevens players
New Zealand male rugby sevens players
Hino Red Dolphins players
Blues (Super Rugby) players
Tongan rugby union players
Tonga international rugby union players